The Jinjang MRT station is a mass rapid transit (MRT) station in the township of Jinjang, Kuala Lumpur, Malaysia. It is one of the stations on the MRT Putrajaya line.

The station began operations on 16 June 2022 as part of Phase One operations of the Putrajaya Line.

Location 
The station is located at the junction of Jalan Kepong and Segambut Bypass.

Station features 

 Elevated station with island platform
 Park & Ride

Bus Services

Feeder buses

Other buses

References

External links
 Jinjang MRT Station | mrt.com.my
 Klang Valley Mass Rapid Transit
 MRT Hawk-Eye View

Rapid transit stations in Kuala Lumpur
Sungai Buloh-Serdang-Putrajaya Line
Railway stations opened in 2022